Aliaksei Aliaksandravich Abalmasau (or Aleksey Abalmasov, born 20 June 1980) is a Belarusian sprint canoeist who has competed since 1998. Competing in two Summer Olympics, he won a gold medal in the K-4 1000 m event at Beijing in 2008.

Abalmasau's first senior appearance was at the 2000 European championships. They rapidly challenged the world's elite, winning two bronze medals at the European championships in Milan in 2001 and the world championship silver medal in Seville in 2002. In 2003, however, early-season results were not repeated at the world championships in Gainesville, USA as they finished out of the medals.

In 2004, with Dziamyan Turchyn now on board in place of Aleksey Skurkovskiy they won the senior European K-2 500 m silver medal in Poznań, Poland. In the K-4 1000 m Olympic final in Athens, they finished sixth.

In 2005 a gold medal in the European final was followed by victory at the 2005 World Championships in Zagreb, Croatia. They also won the bronze medal in the K-4 200 m final.

At the 2006 European Championships in Račice, Czech Republic, Abalmasau and his K-4 teammates did not defend their 500 m title, focusing instead on their least favourite distance, the 1000 m, which will be the only K-4 event at the Beijing Olympics. They won the silver medal, their best result yet over the Olympic distance. The following day they showed their sprinting credentials by winning the gold medal in the 200m final.

At the 2006 World Championships in Szeged, Hungary, the same strategy was used. In the 1000 m they took the bronze medal, again their best-ever showing, although coach Shantarovich said they should have won, accusing the crew of lacking a "killer instinct" in major championships. In the 200 m final, however, they finished in last place after Vadzim Makhneu broke a blade.

At the 2009 world championships in Dartmouth, he won a gold in the K-4 1000 m event. Abalmasau followed up with a silver medal the following year in the K-4 1000 m event.

References
Canoe09.ca profile  (Error by Norex.ca on athlete listing).

1980 births
Living people
People from Barysaw
Belarusian male canoeists
Canoeists at the 2004 Summer Olympics
Canoeists at the 2008 Summer Olympics
Olympic gold medalists for Belarus
Olympic canoeists of Belarus
Olympic medalists in canoeing
ICF Canoe Sprint World Championships medalists in kayak
Medalists at the 2008 Summer Olympics
Sportspeople from Minsk Region